Frode Alnæs (born 3 March 1959) is a Norwegian jazz guitarist and composer, known from cooperation with international artists like Morten Harket, Magne Furuholmen, Arild Andersen, Jon Balke, Ole Edvard Antonsen, Ketil Bjørnstad, Henning Sommerro, Ray Charles, Dee Dee Bridgewater, Ian Hunter, Bjørn Alterhaug, Sissel Kyrkjebø, Gustav Lorentzen, and Jan Erik Vold, and appearances in bands like Dance with a Stranger, Masqualero, Jazzpønkensemblet, and Sidsel Endresen Quartet.

Career
Alnæs was born in Kristiansund. After completing high school in Kristiansund, he attended the Nordmøre Music Folk High School in Surnadal 1978–79, followed by studies in Trondheim (1979–82), together with Tore Brunborg and Nils Petter Molvær. He was among the first to graduate from the Jazz program at the Trondheim Musikkonservatorium in 1982, where he received top marks in guitar playing. In 1987 Alnæs composed the music to rock opera Klæppfesk.

Alnæs was band leader at Moldejazz (1992 and 1994) and at Vossajazz 1993, and appeared with Arild Andersen and Rune Arnesen as a trio at Kongsberg Jazz Festival 1995. In 1996 he attended the Vossajazz with Fliflet/Hamre Energiforsyning, and with The Brazz Bros at Moldejazz (1997).

Honors
Spellemannprisen (1987) in the class Pop, for the album Dance with a Stranger
Spellemannprisen (1989) in the class Pop, for the album Dance with a Stranger
Spellemannprisen (1994) as This year's Spellemann, with Dance with a Stranger
Kreditkassens kulturpris
Fylkeskulturprisen i Møre og Romsdal
COOP Norges Musikkpris 2001
Orkidéprisen 2002
Kristiansund-prisen 2002
Fortidsminneforeningens Bevaringspris 2002, for Dødeladen og Tollboden i Kristiansund
Årets Medmenneske (Røde Kors) 2001
Årets Gromgutt i Møre og Romsdal

Discography

Solo albums
1996: Frode (Universal)
2013: Envy The Man (Big Box)
2016: Kanestrøm (Øra Fonogram)

Collaborations 
With Dance with a Stranger
1987: Dance with a Stranger (Norsk Plateproduksjon)
1989: To/Fool's Paradise  (Norsk Plateproduksjon/RCA)
1991: Atmosphere (Norsk Plateproduksjon)
1994: Look What You've Done! (Norsk Plateproduksjon)
1994: Unplugged Hits (Norsk Plateproduksjon), live
1995: The Best of Dance with a Stranger (Mercury)
1998: Happy Sounds (Mercury)
2007: Everyone Needs a Friend... The Very Best Of (Mercury)

With Masqualero
1988: Aero (ECM)

With Arild Andersen
1990: Sagn (ECM)

With Ketil Bjørnstad
1990: Odyssey (Kirkelig Kulturverksted)
1990: The Shadow (Kirkelig Kulturverksted)

With Morten Harket
1995: Wild Seed (Warner Bros.)
2007: Movies Single (Polydor) 
2008: Letter From Egypt (Polydor)

With Ole Edvard Antonsen
1997: Read My Lips (EMI)

With Arild Andersen & Stian Carstensen
1998: Sommerbrisen (Kirkelig Kulturverksted)
2003: Julegløggen (Kirkelig Kulturverksted)
2006: Høstsløv (Kirkelig Kulturverksted)

With Jan Erik Vold
2005: Vold synger svadaåret inn (Hot Club)

With other projects
1983: Lone Attic (CBS), with Jens Wendelboe
1984: Keep Nose in Front (Hot Club), with AHA
1984: Silhouette (RCA Victor), with Silhouette
1986: Dansere I Natten, with Bjørn Eidsvåg
1986: Folk Er Rare!, with Maj Britt Andersen
1988: Interlude (Norwegian Composers), with Alfred Janson
1988: Constellations (Odin), with Bjørn Alterhaug
1988: Fullmåne), with Anne Grete Preus
1988: Vertigo, with Bjørn Eidsvåg
1989: Heartache Caravan, with Dee Dee Bridgewater
1991: Te Sola Rinn, with Lynni Treekrem
1991: Black Rock on Ice
1992: Nesten Ikke Tilstede, with Jan Eggum
1992: Æ, Rosalita
1994: Beat (Norsk Plateproduksjon), with Tall Trees
1995: Spor Av Ungdom (Valley)
1995: Strong Love Affair (Qwest), with Ray Charles
1997: Thirteen Rounds (Curling Legs), with Jon Eberson Jazzpunkensemble
1997: Towards the Sea (Brazz), with The Brazz Brothers
1997: Hermetic (Rune Grammofon), with Deathprod
1997: Towards the Sea (Brazz), with The Brazz Brothers
2000: 4G (Curling Legs), with 4G (Knut Værnes, Knut Reiersrud, Bjørn Klakegg)
2004: Veldig Respektable Menn (Tylden & Co), with De Musikalske Dvergene
2008: Breeze (Brazz), with Jan Magne Førde
2008: Donna Bacalao
2009: Make Her Believe Maxi-Single (PennyLane), with the XO Project
2010: Julefest I Vest, with "Vassendgutane" and friends
2011: Celebrating 30th anniversary (Brazz), with The Brazz Brothers

Literature
Frode Alnæs – mannen som er en gitar (2009) by Stig Nilsson, Schibsted Forlag.

References

External links 

Dance with a Stranger Official Website

1959 births
Living people
20th-century Norwegian guitarists
21st-century Norwegian guitarists
20th-century Norwegian male musicians
21st-century Norwegian male musicians
Male jazz musicians
Norwegian jazz guitarists
Norwegian male composers
Norwegian University of Science and Technology alumni
Musicians from Kristiansund
Dance with a Stranger (band) members
Masqualero members